Alberto Honrubia (born 22 September 1964) is a Spanish equestrian. He competed in two events at the 1984 Summer Olympics.

References

External links
 

1964 births
Living people
Spanish male equestrians
Olympic equestrians of Spain
Equestrians at the 1984 Summer Olympics
Place of birth missing (living people)